Zakrzew  is a village in Radom County, Masovian Voivodeship, in east-central Poland. It is the seat of the gmina (administrative district) called Gmina Zakrzew.

References

Zakrzew